James Robert McLachlan is a former Canadian politician, who represented the electoral district of Faro in the Yukon Legislative Assembly from 1985 to 1989 and from 2001 to 2002. He was a member of the Yukon Liberal Party, and the party's leader from 1986 to 1989.

He became the party's interim leader after the resignation of Roger Coles due to criminal charges.

Electoral record

2002 general election

|-

 
| style="width: 130px" |Liberal
| Jim McLachlan
|align="right"| 181
|align="right"| 28.3%
|align="right"|  –
|-

|NDP
|Buzz Burgess
|align="right"| 162
|align="right"| 25.3%
|align="right"| –
|- bgcolor="white"
!align="left" colspan=3|Total
!align="right"|640
!align="right"|100.0%
!align="right"| –

2000 By-election

|-
 
| Liberal
| Jim McLachlan
|align="right"| 129
|align="right"| 65.5%
|align="right"| +42.6%

|NDP
| Harold Boehm
|align="right"| 66
|align="right"| 33.5%
|align="right"| -43.1%
|- bgcolor="white"
!align="left" colspan=3|Total
!align="right"| 197
!align="right"| 100.0%
!align="right"| –
|}
On the resignation of Trevor Harding (2000).

2000 general election

|-

|NDP
| Trevor Harding
| align="right"| 177
| align="right"| 76.6%
| align="right"| -17.7%

| Liberal
| Jim McLachlan
| align="right"| 53
| align="right"| 22.9%
| align="right"| +17.7%
|- bgcolor="white"
!align="left" colspan=3|Total
! align=right| 231
! align=right| 100.0%
! align=right| –
|}

1992 general election

|-

|NDP
| Trevor Harding
| align="right"| 388
| align="right"| 53.2%
| align="right"| +10.4%

| Liberal
| Jim McLachlan
| align="right"| 337
| align="right"| 46.2%
| align="right"| +9.1%
|- bgcolor="white"
!align="left" colspan=3|Total
! align=right| 729
! align=right| 100.0%
! align=right| –
|}

1989 general election

|-

| NDP
| Maurice Byblow
| align="right"| 194
| align="right"| 42.8%
| align="right"| +9.3%
|-

| Liberal
| Jim McLachlan
| align="right"| 168
| align="right"| 37.1%
| align="right"| -2.2%
|-

|-
! align=left colspan=3|Total
! align=right| 453
! align=right| 100.0%
! align=right| –
|}

1985 general election

|-

| Liberal
| Jim McLachlan
| align="right"| 142
| align="right"| 39.3%
| align="right"| +17.1%
|-

| NDP
| Sibyl Frei
| align="right"| 121
| align="right"| 33.5%
| align="right"| -15.8%
|-

|-
! align=left colspan=3|Total
! align=right| 361
! align=right| 100.0%
! align=right| –
|}

References

Yukon Liberal Party MLAs
Living people
1943 births
Yukon Liberal Party leaders